Kyung-sook, also spelled Gyeong-suk, Kyung-suk or Kyong-suk, is a Korean feminine given name. Its meaning differs based on the hanja used to write each syllable of the name. There are 54 hanja with the reading "kyung" and 13 hanja with the reading "sook" on the South Korean government's official list of hanja which may be registered for use in given names. Kyung-sook was the seventh-most popular name for baby girls in South Korea in 1950, rising to fifth place by 1960.

People with this name include:
Pak Kyong-suk (1921–2020), North Korean politician
Jeong Gyeong-suk (born ), South Korean flight attendant, one of the unreturned victims of the 1969 Korean Air Lines YS-11 hijacking
Mun Gyeong-suk (born 1945), South Korean volleyball player
Shin Kyung-sook (born 1963), South Korean writer
Kim Gyeong-suk (born 1967), South Korean cyclist
Ri Kyong Suk (North Korean singer) (born 1970), North Korean singer
Won Gyeong-suk (born 1975), South Korean sport shooter
Jin Gyeong-suk (1980–2005), North Korean defector
Hong Kyung-suk (born 1984), South Korean football player
Park Kyung-suk (taekwondo), South Korean taekwondo athlete

See also
List of Korean given names

References

Korean feminine given names